Shana Zadrick (born February 14, 1969) is an American model.  She has appeared on the cover of several editions of Vogue Italia and in the 1992 Sports Illustrated Swimsuit Issue.  She appeared in the second music video for John Mellencamp and Meshell Ndegeocello's version of "Wild Night" by Van Morrison, a track from Mellencamp's album Dance Naked. She has done print work for leading fashion labels including Michael Kors, Calvin Klein and Guess.

Notes

External links
 
 

1969 births
Female models from Colorado
Living people
People from Grand Junction, Colorado
21st-century American women